The Advanced Credit Administration Program is a series of training courses and associated qualifications run by National Association of Credit Management in the United States that are designed to prepare a credit manager in the US for additional managerial responsibilities and for the Credit Business Fellow (CBF) Designation exam.

A combination of course work and NACM Career Roadmap points is needed to qualify for the Credit Business Fellow designation exam.

The courses required for the ACAP program are:

 Business law I (Contracts) 
 Credit law 
 Financial statement analysis II

References

External links
NACM CBF web page.

Credit management